Henry Thomas Soppitt (21 June 1858 in Bradford, Yorkshire – 1 April 1899 in Halifax, Yorkshire) was an English mycologist, plant pathologist, botanist and former greengrocer turned drysalter. He was a close collaborator with Charles Crossland, James Needham, and George Massee and was the first person to show a heteroecious lifecycle in a Puccinia species. Soppitt was a foundational member of the British Mycological Society.

References 

1858 births
1899 deaths
English mycologists
British phytopathologists
British Mycological Society
19th-century British botanists
Greengrocers
Members of the Yorkshire Naturalists' Union
People from Bradford